Craigmont High School is a public high school (grades 9–12) located in Memphis, Tennessee, in the Raleigh community. It was part of the Memphis City Schools district before consolidation with the Shelby County Schools district, beginning with the 2013-14 school year. It is home to the city's only International Studies Program. The school first opened in 1974 for only 7th through 10th grade students, but each subsequent year, added a grade higher.  The first graduating class was the class of 1976.  In 2001, the 7th and 8th grade students, along with the 6th grade students from Brownsville Road Optional Elementary School, formed the new Craigmont Middle School at the opposite end of the same block.  This was done both to help overcrowding and to reduce the extreme age and maturity gaps present in a single building.  Before the physical split between junior and senior high schools, junior high students (those in grades 7, 8, & 9) remain relegated to the north end of the building for classes while those senior high students (grades 10, 11, & 12) attended the majority of their classes in the south end of the school building.  Beginning with the 1991-1992 school year, students from grade 9 would become a part of the senior high section of the building. Former principal, Dr. Ada Jane Walters, would go on to become the Tennessee State Commissioner of Education.

Notable features
Craigmont High School is the only school in the entire Memphis area that has a MAC/OS operated Planetarium.

Clubs

Future Business Leaders of America (FBLA)Family, Career, and Community Leaders of America (FCCLA)
Health Occupations Students of America (HOSA)Technology Student Association (TSA)
DECA
Mu Alpha Theta
Knowledge Bowl
National Honor Society (NHS)Student CouncilInteractDebate ClubModel United NationsAmbassador CorpsInternational Studies ProgramDance TeamAwards
Blue Ribbon Award, 1992, 1993
2011 Basketball State Championship

Notable alumni
Darren Benson, former NFL player for the Dallas Cowboys
Katori Hall, who won the 2010 Olivier Award for Best Play with The Mountaintop and won the 2021 Pulitzer Prize for her play “The Hot Wing King”
Brian Christopher Lawler, professional wrestler in the WWE
Abdulhakim Mujahid Muhammad, formerly known as Carlos Leon Bledsoe, charged in the 2009 jihadi'' Little Rock military recruiting office shooting.
William C. Rhodes, CEO of Auto Zone
David West, Major League pitcher
Terrico White, who was drafted in 2010 by the Detroit Pistons

References

External links
Craigmont High School website

Public high schools in Tennessee
Schools in Memphis, Tennessee
Educational institutions established in 1974
1974 establishments in Tennessee